Zabavnoye is a rural locality (a selo) in Tabunsky Selsoviet, Tabunsky District, Altai Krai, Russia. The population was 233 as of 2013. There are 3 streets.

Geography 
Zabavnoye is located 8 km north of Tabuny (the district's administrative centre) by road. Udalnoye and Altayskoye are the nearest rural localities.

References 

Rural localities in Tabunsky District